Hellbound, Misery, Torment is the second studio album by American hardcore punk band 25 ta Life, released on January 27, 2005.

Track listing
 Abort – 6:40
 Believe in Me – 3:39
 Heavenly Sleep – 5:50
 Question Yourself – 1:59
 Ladyluck – 3:46
 You Can Count on Me – 2:53
 Crucified (Iron Cross cover) – 2:30
 I Don't Care About You (Fear cover) – 2:07
 Haterz, Be Damned – 3:41
 Promise Keeper – 2:26
 Drown in Your Own Blood – 2:07

Credits
Vocals: Rick Healey
Guitars: Ezra van Buskirk (1–8), Shawn (9–11)
Bass: Erick Hernández (1–8), Shawn (9–11)
Drums: Pete DeRosso (1–8)
Additional drums: J Skamz (9–11)

2005 albums
25 ta Life albums